Winding Paths is a book containing a collection of photographs taken by British author Bruce Chatwin during his various travels. These include photographs from the period when he was writing his other works: In Patagonia, The Viceroy of Ouidah, On the Black Hill, The Songlines and Utz.

Photographic collections and books
1998 non-fiction books
Books by Bruce Chatwin
Jonathan Cape books